Törnqvist is a Swedish surname.

Notable people include:
 Gusten Törnqvist, Swedish retired professional ice hockey goaltender
 Jane Törnqvist, Philippine-born Swedish former footballer
 Leo Törnqvist (1911–1983), Finnish statistician
 Rebecka Törnqvist, Swedish jazz and pop vocalist
 Torbjörn Törnqvist,  Swedish billionaire